Sir Paul Peterson Paus (1625 in Vinje – 1682 in Hjartdal), also rendered as Povel Pedersson Paus, was a Norwegian cleric and a signatory of the 1661 Sovereignty Act, the new constitution of Denmark-Norway, as one of the 87 representatives of the Norwegian clerical estate, one of the two privileged estates of the realm in Denmark-Norway. He is known as the author of the 1653 poem "In memoriam Domini Petri Pavli", a loving poem in Latin in memory of his father Peter Paulson Paus. Paul Paus was reputed to be a learned and contemplative personality. His descendants include the playwright Henrik Ibsen.

Life and work

After attending Oslo Cathedral School and the University of Copenhagen, he served as parish priest of the district of Hjartdal from 1649 to 1682. Magnus Brostrup Landstad describes Paul Peterson Paus as a learned and pious priest, well versed in Latin, who unusually held on to Catholic customs in post-Reformation Norway even in the anti-Catholic and strictly Lutheran climate of his lifetime. He had a habit of walking around on the cemetery after sunset. "He went back and forth, up and down, deep in thought, or stood quietly with his head bowed and his hands folded over his chest. When one asked him why he did this, he replied that he was praying for all the departed souls that burned in purgatory. Since he was no longer allowed to celebrate requiem mass for them inside the church, he had to do it outside, and it could certainly be needed, he believed."

Paul Peterson Paus is noted for his 1653 poem "In memoriam Domini Petri Pavli," a loving poem in Latin in memory of his father Peter Paulson Paus, the provost of Upper Telemark. Paul Peterson Paus was the father of parish prist of Kviteseid and poet Hans Paus and of district judge of Upper Telemark Cornelius Paus, and was the 4th great-grandfather of playwright Henrik Ibsen. He used a seal, e.g. on the Sovereignty Act, with a reversed crane in its vigilance.

Notes

References

17th-century Norwegian Lutheran clergy
Signatories of the Sovereignty Act
People from Vinje
People educated at Oslo Cathedral School
University of Copenhagen alumni
Povel Pedersson
1625 births
1682 deaths